Adrian is an unincorporated community in Upshur County, West Virginia, United States. Adrian has a post office with ZIP code 26210.

Some say the origin of the name Adrian is obscure, while others believe the community has the name of an early settler.

References

Unincorporated communities in Upshur County, West Virginia
Unincorporated communities in West Virginia